The Long March 4A, also known as the Changzheng 4A, CZ-4A and LM-4A, sometimes misidentified as the Long March 4 due to the lack of any such designated rocket, was a Chinese orbital carrier rocket. It was launched from Launch Area 7 at the Taiyuan Satellite Launch Center. It was a three-stage rocket, used for two launches in 1988 and 1990. On its maiden flight, on 6 September 1988, it placed the FY-1A weather satellite into orbit. On its second, and final, flight it launched another weather satellite, FY-1B.

A few days after the launch of FY-18, the third-stage of the CZ-4A launch vehicle exploded in the 895 km orbit, creating more than 80 pieces of space debris. This incident led to a redesign of the rocket to include a residual propellant venting system. A venting system was not included in the 4a because the of concern that it would damage the satellite.

It was replaced by a derivative, the Long March 4B, which first flew in 1999. The Long March 4B offers a more powerful third stage, and a larger payload fairing.

List of launches

References

Long March (rocket family)
Spacecraft that broke apart in space